A legatee, in the law of wills, is any individual or organization bequeathed any portion of a testator's estate.

Usage
Depending upon local custom, legatees may be called "devisees".  Traditionally, "legatees" took personal property under will and "devisees" took land under will.  Brooker v. Brooker (Tex. Civ.App., 76 S.W.2d 180, 183) asserts that "devisee" may refer to "those who take under will without any distinction between realty and personalty ... though commonly it refers to one who takes personal property" under a will.

See also 
Beneficiary

References
Black's Law Dictionary 6th edition (West Publishing, St. Paul, MN: 1997), 453, 897.

Wills and trusts